Land of Fortune is the second and final studio album by Australian country rock music group Stars, released in June 1979, the album peaked at number 35 on the Australian charts, remaining on the chart for 17 weeks.

Track listing

Charts

Release history

References

1979 albums
Stars (Australian band) albums
Mushroom Records albums